K194 or K-194 may refer to:

K-194 (Kansas highway), a state highway in Kansas
Mass in D major, K. 194